Valea Cășăriei River may refer to:

 Valea Cășăriei, a right tributary of the Prahova in Sinaia, Prahova County
 Valea Cășăriei, a left tributary of the Prahova near Sinaia, Prahova County

See also 
 Cășăria River (disambiguation)